Anisah Amanodin-Umpa (born Anisah Bagul Amanodin; July 10, 1961) is a Filipino judge who is currently serving as an associate justice of the Court of Appeals of the Philippines. She succeeded Justice Henri Jean Pual Inting who was promoted to the Supreme Court on May 27, 2019.

Amanodin-Umpa, who hails from Balindong, Lanao del Sur, was appointed to the Court of Appeals on April 13, 2020, but took the oath as an associate justice on December 22, 2020. She became the first Moro woman appointed as an associate justice in the court.

She earned degrees in accountancy and law at the Mindanao State University in Marawi.

References

1961 births
Living people
Filipino women judges
People from Lanao del Sur
Mindanao State University alumni
Filipino judges
Justices of the Court of Appeals of the Philippines